The Cymru Premier is an association football league based in Wales. Formed in 1992 as the League of Wales, it was the first national football league in the country. The competition changed its name to the Welsh Premier League in 2002 and then to the Cymru Premier in 2019.  In its inaugural season 20 teams played in the league, but it has since been significantly restructured and had 12 member clubs in the 2018–19 season. Although it is the highest level of the Welsh football league system, the Welsh Premier League has never included the country's major professional clubs, Cardiff City, Swansea City, Wrexham and Newport County.  For historical reasons these clubs all play within the English league system. Instead the Welsh Premier League consists primarily of clubs from large towns (like Barry and Bridgend) and some smaller towns (like Bala), and the majority of the players are semi-professional.  As of 2013, The New Saints, who have played in Oswestry in England since 2005, were the only full-time professional team in the league.

Since its formation, 39 clubs have taken part in the league.  The only clubs to have played in the league in every season since it was formed are Aberystwyth Town and Newtown.  Conversely two other founder members, Abergavenny Thursdays and Llanidloes Town, were relegated at the end of the league's inaugural season and have never returned.  Two other clubs, Llangefni Town and Cardiff Grange Harlequins, have spent only a single season in the league.  The most recent team to make its debut in the league was Penybont, who gained promotion to the league for the first time in 2019.  A system of promotion and relegation exists between the Cymru Premier and the two regional leagues at the second level of the Welsh league system, the Cymru North in the northern half of the country and the Cymru South in the southern half.

Clubs
The table shows the first and most recent season in which each club competed in the league up to and including the 2019–20 season. Some clubs' membership was intermittent between their first and last season. The name shown for each club is the most recent, and the table is initially sorted in alphabetical order of these names. Any other names under which the club played in the league are shown in footnotes. A dagger symbol indicates that the club was a founder member of the league.

Notes

  Known as Airbus UK until 2007
  Known as Cemaes Ynys Mon from 1997 until 1998
  Known as Flexsys Cefn Druids until 2003, NEWI Cefn Druids from 2003 until 2009, and Elements Cefn Druids from 2009 until 2010
  Known as Gap Connah's Quay from 2008 to 2017
  Known as MBi Llandudno from 2015 to 2016
  Known as Neath Athletic until 2008
  Known as Port Talbot Athletic until 2001
  Known as Technogroup Welshpool between 2009 and 2011
  Known as Llansantffraid until 1997 and Total Network Solutions from 1997 until 2006.  Merged with fellow Welsh Premier League club Oswestry Town in 2003, continuing under the Total Network Solutions name.
  Inter Cardiff played in the Welsh Premier League until 2000, but was known as Inter Cable Tel from 1996 until 1999.  In 2000 the club merged with UWIC of the Welsh Football League to form UWIC Inter Cardiff and continued to play in the Welsh Premier League.  The club adopted its current name in 2012.

References 

 
Premier